Xplay (previously GameSpot TV and Extended Play) is a TV program about video games. The program, known for its reviews and comedy skits, aired on G4 in the United States and had aired on G4 Canada in Canada (and briefly on YTV during its time as GameSpot TV), FUEL TV in Australia, Ego in Israel, GXT in Italy, MTV Russia & Rambler TV in Russia, Solar Sports in the Philippines, and Adult Swim and MuchMusic in Latin America.

The show in its previous incarnation was hosted by Morgan Webb and Blair Herter, with Kristin Adams (née Holt) and Jessica Chobot serving as special correspondents/co-hosts (Tiffany Smith, Alex Sim-Wise and Joel Gourdin have also served as correspondents during the show's run). Adam Sessler was the original host of the program; he previously co-hosted with Lauren Fielder and Kate Botello.

Xplay began on ZDTV in 1998 as GameSpot TV, where Sessler co-hosted with Fielder for the show's first year, then co-hosted with Botello up through 2002 (the producers of ZDTV originally had plans to air a video-game program when the channel launched called Extended Play that would be hosted by Simon Rex; however, when an agreement was reached with the makers of the newly created GameSpot website, plans for the original show's format were scrapped in favor of a GameSpot-branded program, and Rex was dropped as host).

The show assumed the previously rejected Extended Play moniker in 2001 after ZDTV changed to TechTV and the partnership with Ziff Davis' GameSpot ended. Botello left in early 2002, and Sessler hosted the show by himself up until April 2003, when Webb joined the cast and the show was renamed X-Play.

A new incarnation of the show was featured on the revived G4 network which operated from November 2021 to October 2022.

History
GameSpot TV, Extended Play, and X-Play all originated in San Francisco, California. Throughout the course of the show's history, it has gone through numerous changes, in more than just name.

GameSpot TV
In the days of GameSpot TV, the show was filmed on a simple ZDTV studio set consisting of faux-brick walls, randomly positioned TV monitors, and functioning Gauntlet Legends and Rival Schools arcade game cabinets. For the occasional special episode, filming would move off-site to another location, such as the Sony Metreon arcade, and numerous game conventions such as the Classic Gaming Expo and E3. Each episode would start off with Game News, where Sessler or Fielder would give a brief overview of top news stories featured on the GameSpot website. Game reviews were run in a segment known as The Grill (games were graded on GameSpot's official 0.1-10.0 system), Spotlight showcased special content such as interviews with industry leaders, and Game Breakers featured strategy guides and hints for recently released games. New episodes would debut on weekend mornings at 10:00 a.m. EST. Botello became Sessler's new co-host on April 29, 2000, and towards the end, the 10-point grading system was changed to a 5-point system.

Extended Play
When GameSpot TV converted to Extended Play on February 17, 2001, the show moved entirely to the Metreon, and took on a very simple style and format. Filming consisted of co-hosts Sessler and Botello and a small single camera crew; the show featured strictly game reviews and game hints. New episodes debuted once a week at 9:00 p.m. EST. Like GameSpot TV, certain special episodes would be filmed elsewhere. In August 2002, the series became a daily program with a mix of repeats and first-run episodes airing Monday-Friday at 4:00 p.m. EST, with Friday episodes remaining in the 9:00 p.m. timeslot. After the departure of Botello on March 29, 2002, Sessler continued to host at the Metreon by himself, until the change to X-Play in April 2003.

X-Play San Francisco
When X-Play debuted on April 28, 2003
the show moved back to the TechTV studios, and Morgan Webb came on board as co-host, leaving her previous hosting duties on TechTV's The Screen Savers and Call for Help. X-Play had a larger scale than that of Extended Play, but it still maintained an extremely simple and spartan style. Filming was done in TechTV's Studio A, home to the sets of Call For Help, Fresh Gear, and TechLive. The filming setup was increased to three cameras; a main floor camera, a Jibcam for high angle shots, and a black-and-white handheld DV camera, which would be cut to suddenly and intermittently throughout episodes.

X-Play's primary set consisted of a single couch, coffee table and television (with working game consoles) positioned in the middle of the large studio floor, but hosts Sessler and Webb would migrate around various areas of the studio, normally not even going to their actual set until the end of the program. Each episode would typically conclude with Sessler and Webb playing one of the consoles on the TV. The show's format consisted primarily of game reviews and previews (with some previews being conducted as live in-studio demos by Morgan and Adam), with an occasional game-related sketch thrown in for comedic value.

The Disembodied Voice was also introduced to the show at this phase in its history. This unseen announcer would begin each episode with an often over-the-top introduction to which the hosts usually responded or commented (these comments varied widely, ranging from total non-sequiturs to Gilbert and Sullivan references to current events, along with viewer-submitted intros taken from the show's web forums).

Unlike its predecessors, X-Play had more of an edge, containing some adult language and more mature (sometimes controversial) subject matter. As a result, it was paired in a programming block with the network's other new show, Unscrewed with Martin Sargent. X-Play originally ran five nights a week at 11:30 p.m. EST, but it was moved up to 11:00 EST soon after. X-Play aired four brand new episodes for their first two weeks, but would ultimately air three new episodes a week for the majority of the show's remainder on TechTV.

Many of the episodes created during this time period aired on the G4 Rewind block of retro programming in 2008; the first episode would end up being the last show on the channel itself before it officially shut down on December 31, 2014.

X-Play Los Angeles

Comcast purchased TechTV in May 2004 and merged it with its gaming channel, G4, necessitating a move for X-Play's base of operations from San Francisco to G4's Santa Monica studios. X-Play continued production at the TechTV studios in San Francisco until August 2004. The final episode to be produced in San Francisco aired on August 24, 2004.

The first episode of X-Play to be filmed at the Los Angeles set aired on September 13, 2004. The new set designed for the show resembled a lounge—or rumpus room - where the hosts could sit around while discussing their latest reviews (during the 400th episode, which originally aired on May 8, 2006, all chairs were removed from the set so that Adam and Morgan had to stand throughout the duration of each episode).

While originally maintaining its late-night time slot, new episodes were eventually moved to 4:00 p.m. EST in the afternoons (usually airing on Mondays, Tuesdays, and Wednesdays) starting on April 10, 2006. This changed to 3:00 p.m. EST on September 5, 2006, before X-Play returned to prime-time on November 6 of the same year, to an 8:00 p.m. EST timeslot.

On March 4, 2007, it was announced that the G4 Studios in Santa Monica would close on April 15. Production of G4 programs was relocated to the Studios of the E! Television Network situated elsewhere in the Los Angeles area. As a consequence, new sets had to be designed for X-Play, and many G4 employees involved in production were laid off.

The E! Building's set was smaller than the Santa Monica studio, thus some aspects of the studio had to be shrunk down. The X-Play logo was retro-fitted to sit above the stage on the right-hand side of the set, with curtains surrounding the entirety of the space to create a sense of intimacy; a large flat-screen monitor was also placed in the background, and several small decorative glass balls were strategically placed around various spots on the floor (Adam and Morgan would often joke of their fear that they would trip over one of these balls and hurt themselves). During video-game analysis and viewer mail segments, Sessler and Webb would sit in orange recliner chairs as they debated over the issue at hand.

X-Play Expands
On January 14, 2008, G4 commenced with a complete overhaul to the show's entire format, branding the move as X-Play "jumping to the next level".

Both Adam and Morgan have stated that this new format represents "the type of show that they've always wanted X-Play to be", whereby a strict focus on game reviews was replaced with a broader range of topics relating to the video-game field (including more in-depth gaming news, first looks at game demos, and game cheat-codes/strategies with Kristin Adams twice a week).

The set was once again refurbished to coincide with the change, as the studio now has blue-tinged walls covered with several flat-screen monitors, and a giant orange X-Play logo (also newly redesigned for the relaunch) covering the floor. In addition, G4 took advantage of the new set and show format by expanding X-Play's schedule in order to air new episodes five days a week.

However, economic factors forced G4 to contract X-Play's schedule back down to only three original episodes per week, starting on March 2, 2009; in addition, the show's timeslot was moved out of prime-time to 6:30 p.m. EST (although reruns still air at 8 o'clock) and a number of X-Play staff members were laid off.

X-Play XL
In December 2008, the show aired X-Large one-hour episodes every Tuesday, Thursday, and Friday. According to G4 television president Neil Tiles, this was an experimental change with the possibility of having all episodes run 60 minutes long sometime in the future where new segments were incorporated to see if X-Play could "go deeper than the current half hour show allows." Tiles also stated that the writers will be looking to add "more comedy" back into the program "as requested."

1,000th episode
On February 1, 2010, X-Play aired its 1,000th episode. To commemorate this milestone, G4 aired a six-hour marathon containing favorite episodes of the series, leading up to the premiere of the actual new episode.

Changes in 2012
In April 2012, it was announced that Sessler would no longer be part of G4. Blair Herter, previously a co-host on X-Play, would become the new co-host of the series. The X-Play set was once again redesigned, and debuted on the June 18, 2012 episode. The new set featured giant white-tinged flatscreen monitors (displaying two large orange-and-black "X" logos) positioned behind the hosts, as well as the addition of a studio audience (making the presentation of the program similar to that of Attack of the Show!). Also, there is an area of the studio with two large reclining chairs and a glass table, used as a place to interview featured guests (such as Mark Lamia from Treyarch and Ted Price from Insomniac Games).

Original series finale
On October 26, 2012, it was reported that the show (along with Attack of the Show!) would cease production after 2012. The hour-long finale of the original iteration of X-Play aired on January 23, 2013. During the broadcast, the hosts announced that the network would be auctioning off X-Play memorabilia via eBay (the set was even designed to resemble a telethon, with several people—Drunk Link, Canadian Guy, Superman, a pair of Imperial Stormtroopers - manning phones), and that all proceeds from the winning bids would be donated to Child's Play at childsplaycharity.org/xplay. The three items auctioned off were a seven-foot Dovahkiin statue, a signed copy of the script for the final episode, and a Halo 4 Limited Edition Xbox 360 console bundle signed by the X-Play staff.

After a montage of scenes from the show's history to close out the broadcast (with the tagline "A show on television, April 2003 - January 2013"), the remaining cast and crew thanked the viewers, as well as the developers for making the games that made the show possible ("even Koei, because ... taking a dump on Dynasty Warriors filled up a lotta time"). The closing credits then ran in the style of a 1980s-era video game, with an 8-bit version of the logo and the phrase "CONGRATULATIONS!!! You have completed X-Play" written in an 8-bit font and set to chiptune music. Once the credits were complete, the words "GAME OVER" appeared on screen along with an Xbox Live "Achievement Unlocked: 100G - Mission Complete" badge, with the G4 Media copyright box shown in the bottom left corner.

When G4 ceased broadcasting on December 31, 2014, the last program broadcast at 11:30pm EST was the first episode of X-Play.

Webb and Sessler reunited for Bethesda Softworks' press conference at E3 in 2016.

Revival 
On July 24, 2020, G4 announced a revival of the network set for a 2021 launch. Later on November 24, 2020, G4 released A Very Special G4 Reunion Special, which featured former X-Play hosts Adam Sessler, Morgan Webb, and Blair Herter (who is one of the key people behind the re-launch), as well as correspondent Kristin Adams. On January 28, 2021, G4 announced that X-Play (alongside Attack of the Show!) would return with it. On February 12, 2021, G4 announced that Adam Sessler would return to host. The revival premiered on November 19, 2021. The revival was broadcast live on G4's Twitch and YouTube channels. Unlike the previous iteration, the episodes were two hours long (they were later cut down to 30-minute episodes on G4's cable channel). Sessler, Froskurinn, The Completionist and The Black Hokage were co-hosts of this revival; Sessler mainly co-hosted the show remotely from his San Francisco home while the remaining co-hosts were based at G4’s studio in Los Angeles. Froskurinn was let go after G4 bought out the remainder of her contract in September 2022.

The show was canceled in October 2022 with the closure of G4.

Reviews
There have been over 2,705 games reviewed on X-Play; for most of the show's run, reviews were designated by a five-point rating scale, based on such factors as graphics, sound, gameplay, and playability (i.e. replay value).

Original ratings scale
On X-Play's original TechTV homepage, the ratings system was broken down in the following way:

The first game to receive a perfect "5 out of 5" rating was Tom Clancy's Splinter Cell during the November 20th (2002) episode, while the first game to receive a "1 out of 5" rating was Infogrames' 2003 racer Humvee Assault, during the May 29th (2003) episode.

2007 ratings primer
In a 2007 episode billed as a "primer on our scoring system", Adam and Morgan further elaborated on their ratings scale:
 A score of 1 is a game that "has to produce true crappiness, [through] the full cooperation of an entire development team - level designers taking off early to attend their children's soccer games, animators getting so high during their lunchbreak that they can't operate their mouse, and of course money hungry execs who will release anything if they can dupe kids into begging their moms for it."
Example Given: 50 Cent: Bulletproof
 A score of 2 "is such a difficult score to give, because it requires a game that fundamentally fails, but has a barely redeeming charm which makes it untenable to give a 1; it's that Suddenly Susan cocktail of technical competence floated atop a pile of dreck."
Example Given: Genji: Days of the Blade
 There are different levels to a score of 3 - "there's the 3 that's a mix of very good and very bad elements (like Blood Will Tell) or 3's that have a great concept that's poorly executed (like Railroads!), and then there's those 3's that are just churned out because they know people will buy them even though there's nothing original in it (like every FIFA game ever)."
Example Given: Sid Meier's Railroads!
 "There are really two kinds of games that get 4's regularly: these are great games with significant problems (like Dead Rising) and games that are amazing but just aren't suited for everyone (the Warhammer: Dark Crusade expansion or any of the Sims expansions are good examples)."
Example Given: Dead Rising
 Titles that earn a perfect 5 out of 5 are "those magnificent games which, whatever minor flaws they may have, call out to us and say, 'Buy me, you must buy me' ... "
Example Given: Ōkami

During this episode, the hosts also explained why they use a 5-point ratings system, rather than a 10- or even 100-point scale:

2011 ratings primer
On the January 24, 2011 episode, Adam and Morgan gave an updated ratings primer in response to confusion spawned by aggregator review sites like Metacritic. To that end, the X-Play review scale was broken down in the following manner:

1 out of 5
 Broken controls
 Amateurish design
 Less fun than a menu screen
 Mainly shoddy licensed games (Clash of the Titans) and shovelware (Tournament of Legends)

2 out of 5
 Some fun to be had
 Serious flaws in gameplay
 Rental at best
 Examples given were Quantum Theory and Tron: Evolution

3 out of 5
 Not bad, not great (average)
 Technically competent
 Often lacking in ambition
 Mainly rushed sequels (Front Mission Evolved) and functional licensed games (James Bond 007: Blood Stone)

4 out of 5
 Good game with good ideas
 Accomplishes most goals
 Minor flaws hurt playability
 Games that might not be for everyone (Heavy Rain)

5 out of 5
 Outstanding, genre-defining title
 Realizes all ambitions of its design
 Renews your faith in gaming
 Examples given were Red Dead Redemption and Mass Effect 2

Introduction of the half star
During the 2012 season premiere (January 17), the "half star" was introduced to the X-Play ratings system, with the hosts explaining that they felt a change towards a "more granular ratings scale will help distinguish the great games from the really great games from the really really great games." They also believed that over the years it had gotten "a little too easy to score the coveted 5 out of 5," and that the change will make such an accomplishment "more of a rarity"; it also means that the lowest score a game can achieve is now a "point-5 out of 5."

In addition, the review scale was again broken down to make the show's criteria clear to the viewing audience:

5 stars
 Exceptional game
 A true must-play
 Example Given: Gears of War 3

4 stars
 Great game with minor issues
 Lacks that "certain something"
 Example Given: The Legend of Zelda: Skyward Sword

3 stars
 Decent game
 Nothing special, nothing awful
 Example Given: Dead Island

2 stars
 Severely flawed
 Not recommended
 Example Given: The Lord of the Rings: War in the North

1 star
 Truly awful
 No redeeming qualities
 Example Given: Thor: God of Thunder

The hosts concluded this explanation with the following caveat:

The first game to receive a half-star in its rating was Kingdoms of Amalur: Reckoning (two and a half stars) during the February 13th (2012) episode.

The first game to receive the lowest possible rating was Steel Battalion: Heavy Armor (0.5 stars) during the July 2nd (2012) episode.

During the April 8 (2013) edition of "Sessler's ... Something", Adam (then an employee of Revision3) implied that the introduction of the half-star rating was actually pushed through by G4 executives without his knowledge; he stated that he "came back in 2013 to find out that we had moved to a half-star system as well, [and] it was all at the behest of one very very large publisher who said that [the show] wouldn't be taken seriously unless we were listed on Metacritic."

2021 relaunch
With the relaunch of the show, the rating system has been simplified back down to its original "out of 5" format. In opting to get rid of half points, Adam Sessler stated that half points "are for cowards" and that "score[s] are not reviews." In fact, Adam says that he prefers to not give scores at all, but that the system was an integral part of the old show that they wanted to carry over to the new iteration; the score reflects the hosts' thoughts on the game.

During the November 19, 2021 episode broadcast live on Twitch, Adam and new Xplay hosts TheBlackHokage, Froskurinn, and Jirard "The Completionist" Khalil broke down the revised Xplay rating scale as follows:

1 out of 5 - Broken, Unfinished, or Worthless

 Rarely "awarded".
 We're embarrassed FOR this game.
 A waste of a player's money and time.
 No fun to be had except to watch this game be roasted by Xplay.

Examples Given: Cyberpunk 2077 for PlayStation 4, Shadow the Hedgehog (video game)

2 out of 5 - This is a bad game

 Aggressively poor design decisions were made.
 It makes you angry to keep playing.
 The bad overwhelms the good.

Examples Given: Crisis Core Final Fantasy VII, Apex Legends for Nintendo Switch.

3 out of 5 - This is a fine game

 A "good" game.
 Enjoyable, but lacks that special something.
 Forgettable, but technically competent.

Example Given: Aliens: Fireteam Elite

4 out of 5 - This is a great game

 Top of the "normal" review scale.
 Technically perfect title that lacks some sort of spark.
 Top-level game that never truly surprises the player.

Examples Given: Halo Wars, Persona 4, Brütal Legend.

5 out of 5 - Highest Score Possible

 Rarely awarded.
 More than the sum of its parts.
 Creates a lasting, unique experience for the player.
 A must-play!
 Major contender for Game of the Year.

Examples Given: Metal Gear Solid 4: Guns of the Patriots, Bully (video game), No More Heroes (video game), Psychonauts 2.

During the breakdown, Froskurinn tells viewers to think of the scale "less as a 5 point scale and more of a 4 point scale, with the 5 as a bonus that is very, very hard to reach."

Sketches and segments
Various recurring segments and comedy skits have been used throughout the show's history by the X-Play writers.

Gaming Update/The Feed: Gaming Edition
The Gaming Update originally began in 2007 as a short segment (hosted by Joel Gourdin) which recapped the top three or four news items of the day, and would often air before leading out to commercial. When X-Play relaunched with their new format in 2008, the segment developed into a two- to three-minute piece running at the start of each show, narrated by either Adam or Morgan (or by Blair Herter, who served as X-Play newsdesk producer at the time), then continued via a news ticker at the bottom of the screen throughout the rest of the episode.

Video Viewer Mail/X-Play Inbox
Adam and Morgan would often read selected correspondence from the program's viewers at the end of every episode. These messages from the fans could be questions about the current state of the videogame
industry, requests for recommendations on the best games to buy, or (especially during the TechTV era) hate mail from viewers who felt that X-Play did not give certain games a "fair" rating.

On November 6, 2006, X-Play gave their Viewer Mail segment a high-tech face-lift, by renaming it Video Viewer Mail. While previous correspondence was held via the written word or e-mail, the producers added the
ability for viewers to also record short clips of themselves asking questions with a webcam or video recorder; people who had their viewer mail appear on air often would receive a free gift, such as a game or T-shirt
provided by Jinx.com.

In early 2011, this segment was again rebranded as simply The X-Play Inbox, with the practice of featuring video clips sent in from viewers seemingly dropped altogether.

Face Time
This segment featured the hosts conducting an interview with a personality from the gaming community (programmers, directors, company CEOs, etc.) either in studio or via satellite. It continued the X-Play tradition of having famous names on their show, including non-gaming celebrities such as Adam West, David Duchovny, John Cleese, Ben Affleck, Angelina Jolie, Carmen Electra, Ben Stiller, Andrew W.K., Rob Van Dam, Kurt Angle, Quentin Richardson, Jet Li, Vin Diesel, Janina Gavankar, and Kumail Nanjiani.

X-List
A top-five list compiled by the X-Play writers that have to do with video games (including Top Five Smash Bros. Levels, Top Five Creatures in Halo 3, and Top Five Recommended Obscure Games).

Cheat!
The Cheat! concept originally existed as a half-hour television program airing on the G4 network; however, in 2008 the show's host - Kristin Adams (née Holt) - moved over to the X-Play staff and Cheat! was re-created
as a single segment where she provided cheat codes and/or secrets for currently released games to the viewing audience.

Spoiler Theater
In this segment, Adam and Morgan showcased and spoiled the endings of current-generation games that had been on the market for some time (their reasoning was that the game had been available to the home viewers for such a length of time that if they have not yet purchased/beaten said game by this point, they never will). Past games that have been given the Spoiler Theater treatment include Metroid Prime, Resident Evil 4, Kingdom Hearts, Kingdom Hearts II, Devil May Cry, Conker's Bad Fur Day, and Metal Gear Solid 2.

There was also an occasional segment called Insignificant Spoiler Theater (alternately identified as Not-So-Spoiler Theater and Irrelevant Spoiler Theater on G4's website), which featured the endings of games that either exhibited very little in the way of plot (such as Katamari Damacy and Left Behind: Eternal Forces) or were based on movies where the storylines are already well-known (like The Godfather, Reservoir Dogs, and Pirates of the Caribbean).

X-Play Investigates
This segment began during the TechTV era as a parody of investigative news programs; X-Play would delve into such "hard-hitting" issues as the effects of E-rated games on America's youth, just what the "cool" people (such as then-TechLive anchor Chris Leary) were into, the horrors of animal testing for video-game quality control, and why certain intellectual property - like the TV show American Chopper - deserved to have their own video games (in the cleverly titled "How'd They Get a Game?").

However, this segment has recently taken on a more serious tone, with the show tackling subjects without the sole intent of creating comedy skits. Examples include a look at the portrayal of sex in video games, the prevalence of "achievement whores", and an inspection of the life of competitive gamer Steve Wiebe.

Best Of Awards

X-Play would dedicate an entire show to the best games released over the preceding twelve months; awards were handed out in several categories, such as "Most Original Game" and "Best Handheld Game", but the most prestigious - and most hotly debated - is "Game of the Year":

 2021 winner - Psychonauts 2
 2012 winner - Borderlands 2
 2011 winner - The Elder Scrolls V: Skyrim
 2010 winner - Mass Effect 2
 2009 winner - Uncharted 2: Among Thieves
 2008 winner - Fable II
 2007 winner - BioShock
 2006 winner - The Legend of Zelda: Twilight Princess
 2005 winner - Resident Evil 4
 2004 winner - Halo 2
 2003 winner - Star Wars: Knights of the Old Republic

Golden Mullet Awards
The polar opposite of X-Play's yearly "Best Of" special, The Golden Mullet Awards were used to showcase the reviewers' picks for worst video games of the past year. The name is a twisted "homage" to the Aquaman character from the poorly reviewed 2003 game Aquaman: Battle for Atlantis, who sported a blonde polygonal mullet hairstyle.

The X-Play Challenge
In this segment, the hosts would have a celebrity guest conduct a speedrun through "World 1-1" of the original Super Mario Bros. for the NES. Their times were then placed on the leaderboard (i.e. a cardboard facsimile of the
flagpole found at the end of the level):

 Randy Pitchford: 21.1 seconds
 Ted Price: 23.6 seconds
 Cliff Bleszinski: 24.0 seconds
 Game: 25.3 seconds
 Scott Porter: 26.3 seconds
 Kiki Wolfkill: 27.5 seconds
 Ken Levine: 31.6 seconds
 Andrew W.K.: 33.1 seconds
 Ernest Cline: 38.5 seconds
 Thomas Jane: 39.7 seconds
 Todd Stashwick: 42.7 seconds

Non-Denominational Holiday Buyer's Guide
For the holiday season, X-Play aired gift guide episodes that recommends video games to viewers for Christmas.

Themes

Recurring characters
X-Play has amassed a large group of fictional characters that will appear from time to time, often to bring some humor during game reviews.

Interns
X-Play has its own cast of interns (students from local universities who have signed up with G4 to gain valuable work experience in the television production field), who will sometimes appear as characters on the show. When appearing on camera, they are commonly outfitted in a white undershirt with the word INTERN scrawled across the chest in black Sharpie.

Their roles are not relegated to simply being on-screen comic relief, as the interns are accountable for much of the game footage used during reviews/previews. X-Play interns also play a role in other behind-the-scenes work on the show's set; some of the former interns have eventually been hired full-time within the G4 company itself. Examples include Leticia Caparaz (the first intern to be offered a full-time position in 1999 as a Production Assistant and later the program's Web Producer, before leaving the company in June 2004 as a result of the G4/TechTV merger), Jason Frankovitz (he would leave the show in early 2005), Albert Iskander (who has worked as a Production Assistant for G4's Video Game Vixens and G4tv.com), Gene Yraola (now a part of G4's Games Editorial Department, the liaison between the shows and the actual software/hardware companies), Eric Acasio (a production assistant for X-Play) and Emily Mollenkopf (hired as a production assistant on Attack of the Show in 2006).

A near-complete list of interns who have worked on the show follows:
 From San Francisco, California: Leticia Caparaz, Jason Frankovitz, Scott Humphrey, Chris Ivarson, Matt Ketterer, Robert Padbury, Desiree Peel, Jana Suverkropp, Kevin Theobald, Blake Yoshiura, and Kevin Yuen.
 From Los Angeles, California:, Eric Acasio, Russ Brock, Steve Dutzy, Brian Flores, Gil Garcia, Albert Iskander, Isaac Gelman, Kenny, Megan, Erik Merlin, Emily Mollenkopf, Geoff Pinkus, Stephan, Alex Villegas, Chuck Wilkerson, Chris Wilson, Gene Yraola, Rob Yeager, Daniel Powley, Michael "Sully" Sullivan, and Thomas McBeath

The Screaming Intern (played by Robert Manuel) was actually not a true intern, but instead was an editorial coordinator for the show.

Guest appearances
When X-Play was still a part of TechTV, personalities from other shows on the network would often make guest appearances (including Leo Laporte, Yoshi DeHerrera, and Unscrewed's Martin Sargent and Laura Swisher). This continued after the merger with G4, with names like Kevin Pereira, Tina Wood, and Julie Stoffer.

X-Play has also had pseudo-celebrities who are not affiliated with G4 (such as Tony Little, Kato Kaelin, Michael Winslow, and Rip Taylor) appear on the show.

Hatred
There have been several gaming titles/genres/trends over the years which the hosts have displayed an exaggerated sense of "hatred" towards (often playing up their dislike for the cameras in order to make for humorous television). These include:
 Card battle games such as Yu-Gi-Oh!.
 Games based on anime series (particularly Naruto, Dragon Ball Z, One Piece, and Fullmetal Alchemist).
 "Ungodly boob physics", where female video-game characters are rendered with impossibly large breasts that bounce and sway unnaturally and independently from the rest of their bodies (this phenomenon is particularly prevalent in Japanese dating simulation games like Sexy Beach 2).
 Game series which continue to produce titles despite a lack of quality and/or innovation (such as Dynasty Warriors, Mega Man, Leisure Suit Larry, Tony Hawk, and 3D iterations of Sonic The Hedgehog).
 The proliferation of WWII first-person shooter games on the market (during their review of Moscow to Berlin: Red Siege, Morgan remarked "That's it! No more World War II games! According to my contract, I only have to review 75 World War II games per year, and I already hit my quota in March!").
 Video games based on existing IPs (like current movies or TV shows), since they are usually rushed to the market to cash in on the latest craze and end up being painful to actually play (such as the Charlie's Angels or Da Vinci Code video games).
 3D water levels in games, since the show's writers feel that game developers almost never capture the feeling of swimming in an enjoyable manner ("Instead of making us awkwardly pilot our character through zero-gravity space, why don't you just come to our house and punch us in the face? It's exactly the same amount of fun!").
 Escort missions, where the player is forced to keep an NPC character (who has its own health meter) from dying; this often proves difficult when the NPC's A.I. is so insufficient that they continuously place themselves in harm's way (leaving the player with little or no chance to save them). However, Resident Evil 4 is an exception of this.
 Barbie Horse Adventures: Wild Horse Rescue (Morgan has often called this the worst game ever made).
 Jonny Moseley and the ridiculous comments made in his video game Jonny Moseley Mad Trix (including the classic line "What if it snowed in San Francisco?").
 Dane Cook and his brand of comedy.
 Uwe Boll and his film adaptions of video games.
 Shovelware for the Nintendo Wii, like All Star Cheer Squad and "Crappy Minigame Collection No. 272".
 Developers who feel the need to take a perfectly acceptable single-player game and tack on a multiplayer mode.
 Sixaxis controls in PS3 games.
 3D Castlevania games.
 Level grinding in role-playing games.
 Japanese RPGs. This was considered to be Adam's pet peeve where people would tell Adam that Japanese RPGs, such as Final Fantasy, are the best RPGs. Adam however believes that Final Fantasy is not the best RPG.
 Devil May Cry, claiming that it is a "last-gen" game.
 The animated series Avatar: The Last Airbender.

Physical comedy
For comedic purposes, the X-Play writers have portrayed the show as an exceedingly violent working environment; interns are often depicted as suffering from sexual harassment and physical abuse at the hands of the hosts (such as being forced to use a bucket to relieve themselves - instead of the bathroom - or retrieving items suspended over the "X-Play snake pit").

This violent dynamic has also manifested itself within the interactions between the hosts themselves (like when Morgan Webb continuously struck Adam Sessler with a baseball bat during X-Play's mockumentary on the history of violence in video games).

Online content
The producers of X-Play have used a number of internet-driven initiatives to engage the show's technologically savvy audience.

The X-Play Boards
The show's hosts have often been the subject of numerous negative comments (including "Morgan's not really a gamer!" and "Sessler doesn't know gaming because he hates Final Fantasy!") through the show's official message board. The vitriol spewed forth on the forums has become so well-documented that the X-Play staff even produced a music video dedicated to the message board's denizens entitled On the X-Play Boards (MP3 format).

The song was written and performed by Marque Phahee and the Bling Dongs (in reality X-Play segment producer Mark Fahey playing an acoustic guitar), featuring the X-Play After School Choir (composed of Morgan, Adam and various recurring X-Play characters). It is also supposed to be the lead track from the X-Play: The Musical motion picture soundtrack (even though X-Play eventually created an actual all-musical episode which made no mention of On the X-Play Boards).

Chat
When X-Play was still a part of TechTV, the show would host an online chat every Tuesday at 1:00 p.m. EST. After the merger with G4, X-Play's official IRC chat room was re-designed by Philippe Detournay and Raphael Seeqmuller using the PJIRC chat client.

On November 6, 2006 (to coincide with the show's move to prime time), G4 integrated X-Play's chat feature into the actual broadcast of each new episode. Using an idea similar to their production of Star Trek 2.0, a window covering the bottom half of the screen would pop up during reviews and display messages typed out by G4 users on X-Play's official web site in real-time (with moderation for broadcast standards to avert profanity and other inappropriate responses). The presentation of the X-Play chat function was later redesigned for the show's 2008 reformatting, so that chat messages would display on the left-hand side of the screen during a review.

Twitter
The interactive chat feature was abandoned in late 2009, in order to take advantage of the increasing popularity of the micro-blogging site Twitter. The show's producers now present X-Play viewers with a question relevant to the day's news/reviews via their official Twitter feed, then display the resulting answers during that night's episode through a scrolling ticker on the bottom portion of the screen.

Starting the week of June 13, 2011, the show began the practice of having their on-air personalities live-tweeting during reruns of the show airing on Thursdays and Fridays.

X-Play: The Online Game
X-Play: The Online Game is a short Flash game created by the San Francisco-based company Orange Design (graphics and audio by Sean Talley, programming by Fearghal O'Dea).

The brief intro sequence begins in the fictitious X-Play Labs (which made an appearance on the show during the X-Play X-Plentions skit), where Morgan is about to put the finishing touches on the X-Play online game. An excited Adam asks if the game can have "fudge zombies and stealthy ninjas and drunken pirates and radioactive Dik-diks", then haphazardly presses a large red button which "digitizes physical matter and materializes digital matter"; this causes all of the bad guys from the X-Play video game to escape (much to Morgan's chagrin).

Once the game begins, players can choose from big-headed versions of either Adam (whose main weapon is Slippy the Fish) or Morgan (whose main weapon is her fists), and battle their way through a few continuously repeating levels of action. Controls consist of the arrow keys for movement, the "A" key to punch, and the "S" key to kick.

The game is no longer available on G4's website, but a mirror site can be found via Orange Design's online company portfolio.

Hyperactive
Culled from the theory that many viewers of TechTV both watched the network while using the internet, TechTV's Hyperactive  was launched in 2004.

Designed to be used as a combination trivia game and chat room which would run concurrently with the 11 PM weeknight block of X-Play and Unscrewed with Martin Sargent, participants could compete against one another by answering questions relating to, and revolving around, video games, pop-culture and host references from episodes that were currently airing. Leaderboards were synchronized with the episodes as they aired, often showcasing the names of the 10 highest scoring contestants as the show came back from each commercial break.

After the merger of TechTV and G4, Hyperactive continued until late 2004. During this time, participants could win an iPod mini by playing the game.

Daily Video Podcast
On November 11, 2005, G4 started offering X-Play segments (reviews, skits, etc.) for free in podcast form via their website and the iTunes Store, giving viewers the opportunity to watch segments on-demand with their computers and portable devices. These podcasts have since become available through other podcatcher software (such as the Zune Marketplace) as well.

X-Play Weekly
On August 14, 2008, a special weekly wrap-up show called X-Play Weekly was made available for download on the Xbox LIVE Video Store, allowing Xbox 360 owners to view highlights from the previous week's episodes for 160 Microsoft Points ($2 US).

Beginning the week of June 15, 2009, X-Play Weekly was also made available for download through the PlayStation Network, also at $2 per weekly program.

Feedback
In September 2009, G4TV.com rebranded its Feed Nightcap vodcast (a web spinoff of the Attack of the Show segment "The Feed") with the new title Feedback . This weekly segment was hosted by Adam Sessler (before Blair Herter took over official hosting duties with the October 19th 2011 episode) and features a rotating panel of co-hosts drawn from X-Play's editorial staff with the occasional guest from the gaming industry (such as Tim Schafer and Cliff Bleszinski). The show's stated goal is to deliver "intelligent, informative, and very very humorous discussion about games" by reviewing current news stories as well as answering viewer questions, and is filmed via a roundtable format in G4's audio recording studio. Even though the show could be considered an extension of the AOTS brand, all of the content for the program is drawn from and presented by X-Play staff.

Book
On October 22, 2004, TechTV (in association with Peachpit Press) published the book The X-Play Insider's Guide to Gaming: All You Ever Wanted to Know About Video Games From G4techTV's Brutally Honest Experts. Written by Marc Saltzman (along with the X-Play Cast) and weighing in at a hefty 468 pages, the book contains game reviews, cheat codes, and Q&A sessions with the cast and crew. Adam and Morgan even went on a nationwide book-signing tour to help promote their literary endeavor.

Copies of the book can be found everywhere from the Brooklyn Public Library to the University of Hong Kong.

References

External links
 
 X-Play microsite to celebrate show re-launch 
 X-Play Reviewed Games Database
 
ZDTV - Gamespot TV (ARCHIVED)

1990s American television series
1998 American television series debuts
2000s American television series
2010s American television series
2013 American television series endings
2020s American television series
2021 American television series debuts
2022 American television series endings
American television series revived after cancellation
English-language television shows
Television shows filmed in Los Angeles
G4 (American TV network) original programming
Infotainment
TechTV original programming
Television shows about video games
Video game culture
Video game journalism
X-Play